Gallery Publishing Group is a general interest publisher and a division of Simon & Schuster which houses the imprints Gallery Books, Pocket Books, Scout Press, Gallery 13, and Saga Press.

Jen Bergstrom is the Senior Vice President and Publisher.

History 
Simon & Schuster created the Gallery Books imprint in 2009 to unite the editorial teams of Pocket Books and Simon Spotlight Entertainment (or SSE), and Gallery Books launched its first list in 2010. Louise Burke was named executive vice-president and publisher while Jennifer Bergstrom, who had been publisher of SSE, would be editor-in-chief. Gallery’s initial mission was to focus on women's fiction, pop culture and entertainment.  

Simon & Schuster announced a reorganization in October 2012 that created four divisions, with the Gallery Publishing Group as one. When the reorganization was complete, Gallery Publishing Group consisted of Gallery Books, Pocket Books, Pocket Star, and Karen Hunter Books. In the years since, Pocket Star and Karen Hunter Books have been disbanded, while new imprints have been created. Pocket Books, which was founded in 1939 and was instrumental in introducing the pocket-size book to the American market, remains active and continues to publish mass-market editions. 

In 2015 the Gallery Publishing Group launched literary fiction imprint Scout Press with Ruth Ware’s debut, In a Dark, Dark Wood. The imprint has continued to publish all of New York Times bestselling author Ware’s books, along with ambitious fiction by authors including Candice Carty Williams, Kristen Roupenian, Andrew MacDonald, and Iain Reid.”

In July 2016, Gallery Books announced a new line of graphic books called Gallery 13. The imprint has published the highest quality visual storytelling by creators including Stephen King, Stan Lee, and James O’Barr. 

In August 2017, Jennifer Bergstrom became senior vice president and publisher following the retirement of Louise Burke.

In March 2019, the all-inclusive fantasy and science fiction imprint Saga Press moved from Simon & Schuster’s Children’s Publishing Group to Gallery. Saga publishes bestselling and esteemed authors including Charlaine Harris, Stephen Graham Jones, Rebecca Roanhorse, and Ken Liu. 

Gallery Books – Gallery Publishing Group’s core, general-interest imprint – has expanded its mission and scope over time and now publishes books in a wide array of categories, including commercial fiction, memoir, and narrative nonfiction.

Imprints 
 Gallery Books, general interest imprint
 Pocket Books, mass market imprint of the Gallery group
 Scout Press, literary fiction imprint
 Gallery 13, graphic novel imprint
 Saga Press, science fiction and fantasy imprint
 MTV Entertainment Books (formerly MTV Books), pop culture imprint, revitalized in 2021

Notable authors 
Simon & Schuster has published thousands of books from thousands of authors. This list represents some of the more notable authors at Gallery Books (those who are culturally significant or have had several bestsellers).

 Ruth Ware
 Stephen Chbosky
 Stephen King
 Tiffany Haddish
 Mike Rowe 
 Olivia Newton-John
 Christina Lauren
 Amy Schumer
 Omarosa Manigault-Newman 
 Clint Hill
 America Ferrera
 Anna Todd
 Catherine Coulter
 JR Ward
 Cecile Richards
 Candice Carty-Williams
 Chelsea Handler
 Lisa Genova
 Oliver Stone

References

External links 
 Gallery Books Home Page
 Gallery 13 Home Page

Simon & Schuster
Book publishing companies of the United States
Book publishing company imprints